Chicago Burlington & Quincy 710 is a preserved 4-6-0 "Ten Wheeler" type steam locomotive on display at the former Lincoln station in Lincoln, Nebraska. Built in 1901, No. 710 was built for high speed passenger service. After a rebuild in 1928, the locomotive provided branch line passenger and freight service until its retirement in 1954.

The locomotive was listed on the National Register of Historic Places on June 20, 1997.

History
CB&Q No. 710 was built in June 1901 originally as the Burlington & Missouri Railroad (B&MR) No. 31 at the Havelock shops in Havelock, Nebraska. The first run of the locomotive was on July 9, 1901 pulling a freight train. Soon, it was assigned to pull high speed passenger trains from Creston to Lincoln, but this lasted less than a year before it was reassigned to run from Lincoln to Ravenna. In October 1904, the B&MR was consolidated into the CB&Q, resulting in B&MR No. 31 becoming CB&Q No. 710. No. 710 underwent major repairs with a new cab and new couplers in 1906 and assigned to the Aurora (Illinois) Division. From 1914 to 1927, the locomotive served on the Brookfield and Hannibal Divisions in Missouri. In 1927 the locomotive was assigned to the La Crosse (Wisconsin) Division, where its service as a mainline locomotive came to an end.

In 1928, major alterations such as reducing the size of the driving wheels took place. After the rebuild, the locomotive was put on the Wymore (Nebraska) Division, usually pulling passenger trains No. 89 and 90, which ran from Omaha to Concordia, KS via Lincoln. No. 710 would normally only pull these trains on the section from Wymore to Concordia. Trains 89 and 90 became mixed trains on November 26, 1932 with a short reintroduction as passenger only trains in 1936, which would be the last time No. 710 pulled a dedicated passenger train. The locomotive was renumbered to No. 910 in the summer of 1951 and continued hauling trains No. 89 and 90 until September 1953. No. 710 was retired in December 1954.

Following retirement, No. 710 was donated to the city of Lincoln in February 1955 and placed in Pioneers Park. It was the first locomotive donated by the CB&Q, and the first locomotive donated to a city in Nebraska. After a restoration in 1991, the locomotive was moved to the present site at the former Lincoln station.

References

External links

4-6-0 locomotives
Passenger locomotives
Individual locomotives of the United States
Railway locomotives introduced in 1901
Standard gauge locomotives of the United States
Chicago, Burlington and Quincy Railroad
Chicago, Burlington and Quincy locomotives
Preserved steam locomotives of Nebraska
Rail transportation on the National Register of Historic Places in Nebraska
Railway locomotives on the National Register of Historic Places
National Register of Historic Places in Lancaster County, Nebraska
Buildings and structures completed in 1901